Ulta Mixes is the first remix album by Australian pop group Wa Wa Nee. The album included extended versions of four singles lifted from their debut studio album, Wa Wa Nee, and three previously unreleased tracks, including "Never Been So in Love" as a track written and recorded for a Japanese TV series.

Track listing

References

1987 remix albums
Wa Wa Nee albums
CBS Records albums